Khavjehei Rural District is a rural district (dehestan) in Meymand District, Firuzabad County, Fars Province, Iran. At the 2006 census, its population was 8,221, in 1,892 families.  The rural district has 45 villages.

References 

Rural Districts of Fars Province
Firuzabad County